Get It may refer to:

Albums
 Get It (Dave Edmunds album) (1977)
 Get It, by X-Sinner (1989)

Songs
 "Get It" (Havana Brown song) (2011)
 "Get It" (Stevie Wonder song) (1987)
 "Get It", by The Black Eyed Peas from Masters of the Sun Vol. 1 (2018)
 "Get It", by Britney Spears (2006)
 "Get It", by Bud Powell from Swingin' with Bud (1958)
 "Get It", by Busta Rhymes (2018)
 "Get It", by Darts (1979)
 "Get It", by Deepfield from Archetypes and Repetition, 2007
 "Get It", by Dukes of Windsor from Minus (2008)
 "Get It", by Kyla La Grange from  Cut Your Teeth (2014)
 "Get It", by Paul McCartney from Tug of War (1982)
 "Get It", by Peaches from Impeach My Bush (2006)
 "Get It", by Styles of Beyond from Fort Minor: We Major (2005)